Sharron Miller is an American television and film director, producer, and screenwriter. She is one of the pioneering women directors who worked regularly in mainstream Hollywood in the 1970s and 1980s (along with Elaine May, Lee Grant, Joan Darling, Joan Micklin Silver, Karen Arthur, Gabrielle Beaumont, Lela Swift, Gwen Arner, and Kim Friedman). In 1984 she was the first woman ever to win the coveted Directors Guild of America Award (DGA Award) for directing a narrative (non-documentary) work.

Career
Born in Enid, Oklahoma and raised in Perry, Oklahoma, Miller began writing and directing short films as a teenager. After graduating from Oklahoma State University in 1971 with a degree in Theatre, she attended graduate school in Film at Northwestern University.  In 1972, she went to Hollywood and worked as a script supervisor, sound editor, and film editor before becoming a professional director in 1976 when she was hired to direct the NBC television series, The Life and Times of Grizzly Adams.  This made her one of the handful of women directing in Hollywood at that time. She also edited the theatrical film Guardian of the Wilderness in 1976, the true story of mountaineer Galen Clark and Abraham Lincoln saving Yosemite from being destroyed by logging companies.

She has written and directed several short films, but the majority of her work has been in television where she has had a long and prolific career directing television movies and series.  Early in her career she studied with acting teachers Jack Garfein, Harold Clurman, and Jeff Corey, and has demonstrated an ability to elicit strong performances from actors. Sharon Gless, Cloris Leachman and Peggy McCay all won Emmy Awards under her direction, and James Stacy received an Emmy nomination.

In 1983 Miller won the DGA Award, two Emmy Awards, the Peabody Award and the Christopher Award for the Afterschool Special she produced and directed, The Woman Who Willed a Miracle. This true-life drama is the story of Leslie Lemke, the blind and mentally retarded boy with cerebral palsy who became world-famous as a savant pianist.  It is one of the most well-known and honored of all Afterschool Specials, receiving Emmy Awards in all the major categories, in addition to numerous other awards.

In 1987 she was nominated for the DGA Award and an Emmy Award for directing two different episodes of the series, Cagney & Lacey (Turn, Turn, Turn part 1 and Turn, Turn, Turn part 2)

Selected filmography

Awards

Memberships
Directors Guild of America
Academy of Television Arts and Sciences

References

External links

Further reading
 "CAGNEY & LACEY ... and Me" by Barney Rosenzweig, iUniverse, Inc. 2007;  
 Sixth Annual International Edition of Film Directors: a Complete Guide (USA), 1988, pg. 10–13, by: Michael Singer;  
 Los Angeles Times (USA) Calendar section, 17 March 1984, pg. 1 + 6, by: Judith Michaelson, "The Girl Who Wanted to Be Like Kazan"

American television directors
American television producers
American women television producers
American television writers
Daytime Emmy Award winners
American women film directors
American women television directors
Living people
Northwestern University School of Communication alumni
Oklahoma State University alumni
American women screenwriters
American women television writers
Year of birth missing (living people)
Place of birth missing (living people)
Directors Guild of America Award winners
Writers from Enid, Oklahoma
Film directors from Oklahoma
Screenwriters from Oklahoma
American women film producers
Film producers from Oklahoma
21st-century American women